KBRI (1570 AM, "Gospel 1570") was a radio station licensed to serve Brinkley, Arkansas, United States. The station was owned by East Arkansas Broadcasters, Inc.

KBRI broadcast a Gospel music format.

History

KBRI was licensed December 21, 1959, to Mason W. Clifton's Tri-County Broadcasting Company. In 1969, an FM counterpart, KBRI-FM (now KTRQ), was built and launched. In 1995, the Tri-County Broadcasting Company sold the station to East Arkansas Broadcasters.

Citing financial reasons, KBRI went silent on October 8, 2013, and did not return to the air. East Arkansas Broadcasters surrendered KBRI's license to the Federal Communications Commission (FCC) on February 3, 2015. The FCC cancelled the license the same day. A new station with the KBRI calls, at 104.1 FM from transmitter at Clarendon, Arkansas, was licensed by the FCC in April 2015.

References

External links

BRI
Monroe County, Arkansas
Radio stations established in 1959
Defunct radio stations in the United States
Radio stations disestablished in 2015
Defunct religious radio stations in the United States
1959 establishments in Arkansas
2015 disestablishments in Arkansas
BRI